Roll On is the 14th studio album by J. J. Cale (and the final one to be released in his lifetime), released on February 24, 2009, by Rounder Records.  All songs were written by Cale; they include "Who Knew", "Former Me", and "Roll On", the last of which is a collaboration with Eric Clapton. Some tracks were recorded at sessions at David Teegarden's studio, north of Tulsa, Oklahoma, in 2003.

Track listing

 "Who Knew" 3:30
 "Former Me" 2:48
 "Where the Sun Don't Shine" 3:07
 "Down to Memphis" 3:05
 "Strange Days" 3:10
 "Cherry Street" 3:43
 "Fonda-Lina" 3:20
 "Leaving in the Morning" 2:37
 "Oh Mary" 3:34
 "Old Friend" 3:55
 "Roll On" (feat. Eric Clapton) 4:43
 "Bring Down the Curtain" 2:51
 "The Taker" (digital-only bonus track)
 "Top Of The Hill" (digital-only bonus track)
 "Worrying Off Your Mind" (digital-only bonus track)

The 3 digital-only bonus tracks are written by J.J. Cale.

"Worrying Off Your Mind" was later released physically (on Because Music label) on April 13, 2019 (at the occasion of Record Store Day) on vinyl format as the b-side of the posthumous J.J. Cale 7" single "Stay Around", the second single to be released from the album Stay Around.

Personnel

Musicians
 David Teegarden - drums (1)
 Christine Lakeland acoustic guitar (1, 9, 10, 11)
 David Chapman - bass guitar (1)
 Jim Karstein - drums (9, 10)
 Walt Richmond - piano (9, 10)
 Bill Raffensperger - bass guitar (9, 10)
 Rocky Frisco - keyboards (10)
 Shelby Eicher - mandolin (10)
 Jim Markham - harmonica (10)
 Don White - guitar (10)
 Jim Keltner - drums (11)
 Mark Leonard - bass guitar (11)
 Glen Dee - piano (11)
 Eric Clapton - guitar (11)
 Steve Ripley - acoustic guitar (11)
 John "Juke" Logan - harmonica (11)
 J. J. Cale - vocals and all other instruments

Production
Mike Test - engineer
 Mike Kappus - executive producer
 David Teegarden - recording
David Chapman - recording
Dana Brown - assistant recording
Ed Barton - recording
Chad Hailey - research
Greg Calbi - mastering
J. J. Cale - producer

Charts

References

2009 albums
J. J. Cale albums
Rounder Records albums